Jayden Davis (born 19 November 2001) is an English professional footballer who plays for Lewes, on loan from Crawley Town as a midfielder.

Career
Davis began his career with Millwall and spent time on loan at King's Lynn Town before signing a one-year contact with Crawley Town in July 2022 following a trial. The club's fans had voted to sign Davis. After making his debut for the club in August 2022, his next appearance came in October, where he scored and gained an assist.

In March 2023, Davis joined Isthmian League Premier Division side Lewes on loan.

References

2001 births
Living people
English footballers
Millwall F.C. players
King's Lynn Town F.C. players
Crawley Town F.C. players
Lewes F.C. players
Association football midfielders
English Football League players
National League (English football) players
Isthmian League players